The Kenyan National Super League  (also referred to as Betika Super League for sponsorship reasons ) is the second tier of the Kenyan football league system, with a promotion and relegation system with the Kenyan Premier League and FKF Division One. Some of the league's member clubs are fully professional, while others are semi-professional.

The league was formed in line with the introduction of a new six-tier system by the Football Kenya Federation to take effect from the beginning of the 2014 season.

Competition
There are 20 clubs in the Kenyan National Super League. During the course of a season, each club plays the others twice (a double round-robin system): once at their home stadium and once at that of their opponents, for a total of 38 games. Teams receive three points for a win and one point for a draw, with no points awarded for a loss. Teams are ranked by total points, then goal difference, and then goals scored. At the end of each season, the club with the most points is crowned champion. If points are equal, the goal difference and then goals scored determine the winner. If still equal, the ordering is determined by their head-to-head records. If there is a tie for the championship, for relegation, or for qualification to other competitions, a play-off match at a neutral venue decides rank. The top two teams are promoted to the Premier League while the third ranked team takes part in a promotion/relegation playoff with the 16th placed team in the Premier League. In the same way, the bottom two teams of the National Super League are relegated to Division One, with the top two teams from both Division One zones promoted in their place.

Clubs

See also
 Kenyan football league system
 Kenyan Premier League
 FKF Division One

References

 
2
Second level football leagues in Africa